WCCS may refer to:

Groups, organizations
Wallace Community College Selma, in Selma, Alabama, USA
 War Camp Community Services (WCCS), former name of The National Recreation Foundation
Watford Christian Counselling Service, in Watford, UK
Westminster Cathedral Choir School, in London, UK
Westminster Catawba Christian School, in Rock Hill, South Carolina, USA
West Country Chest Society, a professional society for respiratory physicians in South West England, UK

Callsigns
WCCS, a radio station in Homer City, Pennsylvania, USA
 a defunct carrier-current radio station, predecessor to WFCS

Other uses
Windows Compute Cluster Server - Microsoft high-performance computing (HPC) cluster technology offering, released at June 2006.

See also

 WCS (disambiguation)
 WCC (disambiguation)